The 1978 Northwestern Wildcats team represented Northwestern University during the 1978 Big Ten Conference football season. In their first year under head coach Rick Venturi, the Wildcats compiled a 0–10–1 record (0–8–1 against Big Ten Conference opponents) and finished in last place in the Big Ten Conference.

The team's offensive leaders were quarterback Kevin Strasser with 1,526 passing yards, Mike Cammon with 322 rushing yards, and Steve Bogan with 353 receiving yards.

Schedule

References

Northwestern
Northwestern Wildcats football seasons
College football winless seasons
Northwestern Wildcats football